Rustai-ye Aliabad (also Romanized as Rūstāī-ye ‘Alīābād; also known as ‘Alīābād) is a village in Soghan Rural District, Soghan District, Arzuiyeh County, Kerman Province, Iran. At the 2006 census, its population was 1,101, in 233 families.

References 

Populated places in Arzuiyeh County